In Your Dreams is a fantasy novel by the British novelist Tom Holt. It is the second book featuring the J. W. Wells magic firm, and was published in 2004: J. W. Wells is inspired by the title character in Gilbert and Sullivan's The Sorcerer.

Plot summary 
Paul Carpenter is the protagonist of the book. The book is summarized in the next book in the series Earth, Air, Fire, and Custard where Paul tells his uncle about what happened to him.

So Paul told him all about it: how he'd got a job as a junior clerk with a firm called J. W. Wells & Co in the City, without knowing what it was they actually did; how it'd come as rather a shock to him when he found out that they were one of the top six firms of family and commercial magicians in the UK, specialising in the entertainment and media, mining and mineral resources, construction, dispute resolution, applied sorcery and pest-control sectors; how he'd almost immediately tried to resign, and how he'd found out a little while later that the reason why they wouldn't let him was that his parents had financed their early retirement to Florida by selling him to the partners of JWW, who wanted him because the knack of doing magic ran in his family to such an extent that it was inevitable that he'd have it too; how he'd briefly found true love with Sophie, the other junior clerk, shortly before she was abducted by Contessa Judy di Castel Bianco, the firm's entertainments and PR partner and hereditary Queen of the Fey, who permanently erased Sophie's feelings for Paul from her mind; how he'd learned scrying for mineral deposits from Mr Tanner, who was half-goblin on his mother's side, and heroism and dragonslaying from Ricky Wurmtoter, the pest-control partner, and a bit of applied sorcery from the younger Mr Wells (before the elder Mr Wells turned him into a photocopier); and how he'd just started learning spatio-temporal displacement theory with Theodorus Van Spee, former professor of classical witchcraft at the University of Leiden and inventor of the portable folding parking-space; oh, and how he'd died, twice (only the second time was an accident) and been put on deposit for a while in the firm's account at the Bank of the Dead.

References

2004 British novels
British fantasy novels
Novels by Tom Holt
Orion Books books